Basque Y is the high-speed rail network being built between the three cities of the Basque Autonomous Community, in Spain; Bilbao, Vitoria-Gasteiz and Donostia-San Sebastián.

Route

It will transport cargo and passengers.
The cargo trains will connect the Port of Bilbao with the Port of Pasaia, (also known as Pasajes/Pasajes-San Pedro) and
will consist of 157 kilometers of double track and 37 kilometers of single track.
Due to the mountainous relief of the region, 105,9 km (62%) will be in 80 tunnels and 10% in 71 bridges.
The minimum speed is 120 km/h, whilst the maximum is 250 km/h.

The Basque Y will be built in European rail gauge. It will connect Madrid via Valladolid and connect France via Irun. While the French high-speed rail line (on which the TGV trains achieve their top speeds) is not planned to reach Hendaye until 2032, the Hendaye-Bordeaux track allows 160 km/h. The network will also include a connection to the Navarrese Corridor, the high speed line projected between Zaragoza and the capital of Navarre, Pamplona.

Travel time comparisons
As announced initially, it could take well under one hour to connect the cities while the current slower network takes from 1 h 40 min to 2.5 hours. However, a closer study revealed in February 2015 that the projections below do not possibly hold water, conspicuously delaying initial time estimates.

Stations
Bilbao-Abando
Vitoria-Gasteiz
Irún
San Sebastián-Norte
Ezkio-Itsaso
Euba

Planning
It took 15 years from the first proposals of a Basque high-speed network to the detailed project. The main issues were disagreements between the series of Spanish and Basque governments, and who would bear the costs. Through the Basque tax agreement, the Spanish government will make initial payments on behalf of the Basque government.

An agreement on 25 April 2006 puts the section between Vitoria-Gasteiz and Bilbao under Spanish control (through Adif), and the section in Gipuzkoa province under Basque control.

It will be the costliest investment in the Basque Country. In June 2012, the European Investment Bank agreed to offer €1bn of funding. The actual completion of the works has been postponed for several times, but the latest deadline was set at 2020 by Basque high-ranking officials. In early 2015, relevant public authorities (Basque Government, Spanish Ministry of Public Works) renewed their commitment with the project, while on the French branch (Aquitaine) financial tensions and public interest considerations risk to halt progress in high-speed rail works.

 services are planned to begin in 2023.

Benefits
It will ease mobility between the Basque capitals, in fact, travel times between Bilbao, Donostia-San Sebastián and Vitoria-Gasteiz will be cut in half. In addition, the Basque government is improving the existing EuskoTren infrastructure between Bilbao and Donostia-San Sebastián, enabling a better connection between smaller towns and big cities.

The cargo traffic will remove lorries from the roads, the railway will connect the Port of Bilbao with Europe's major railway lines. The Basque Y will is being built in European rail gauge.

To reduce the environmental impact, the layout avoids the natural areas of Aizkorri, Urkiola and Aralar. The increase on the usage of railway, will reduce the usage of planes, more polluting than trains. In addition it will be more affordable than traveling by plane, and taking passengers to the very centre of cities, instead of the outskirts, where airports are usually located.

Criticism
The official Y-shaped layout was approved by the Basque Parliament, but criticised by Ezker Batua-Berdeak, a coalition of the Basque branch of United Left, a component member of the Basque Government in 2007. EB put forward a U-shaped layout.

More significant is the opposition staged by the Basque nationalist left and several ecologist groups, such as AHT Gelditu. A demonstration against the train gathered thousands to Arrasate/Mondragón in December 2007. Before the 2010-2011 permanent ceasefire, the Basque armed separatist group ETA had the works as one of its targets. In December 2008, Ignacio Uría Mendizábal, the chief executive of a construction company working on the project, was shot dead by ETA and in February 2009 a bomb planted against Ferrovial went off in Madrid.

PNV's Basque Government has voiced its concern and mistrust over the Madrid government's actual commitment in the face of overdue funding by December 2014. EH Bildu, the leading political force in Gipuzkoa, confirmed in early 2015 its frontal refusal to the project, pointing to the Basque Y's alleged shaky foundations (financially no return or loss, feeble public service). Basque nationalist left's spokespersons labelled the project a "deception-based propaganda operation".

See also 
 High-speed rail in Spain

References

External links 
 Official website of the project.
 Information about the project on the Basque Governments Transportation department.
 Advertisement promoting the Basque Y.
 AHT Ez. Basque opposition to high-speed trains.

2006 in the Basque Country (autonomous community)
2006 in rail transport
2015 in the Basque Country (autonomous community)
2015 in rail transport
2023 in rail transport
High-speed railway lines in Spain
Rail transport in the Basque Country (autonomous community)